Lee Dae-Hee (born 26 April 1974) is a South Korean former professional footballer who played as a goalkeeper.

Club career
Lee joined Bucheon SKin 1993

He joined Pohang Steelers in 2001.

International career
Lee was part of the  South Korea squad at the 1996 Olympics tournament.

References

External links 

1974 births
Living people
South Korean footballers
Association football goalkeepers
South Korea international footballers
Jeju United FC players
Pohang Steelers players
K League 1 players
Olympic footballers of South Korea
Footballers at the 1996 Summer Olympics
Place of birth missing (living people)